XHQD-FM is a radio station located in the city of Chihuahua City, Chihuahua, Mexico, known as Switch FM.

History
XEQD-AM 920 received its concession on May 20, 1963. It was owned by Radio 920 de Chihuahua, S.A. and broadcast with 1,000 watts during the day, and soon after it signed on, 100 at night (changed to 250 in the 1990s).

XEQD was transferred to its current concessionaire in 2009 and approved to migrate to FM in 2011.

The station changed formats from romantic "Romance 95.7" to pop "Switch FM" in October 2019.

External links
 Radio Locator information for XHQD-FM

References

Radio stations in Chihuahua
Mass media in Chihuahua City